Sergei Anatolyevitch Torop (Sergej Anatolʹevič Torop; born 14 January 1961 in Krasnodar, Russian SFSR), known as Vissarion ("He who gives new life" or "life-giving"), is a Russian spiritual teacher and founder of the non-profit, religious organization “Church of the Last Testament”, described by many organizations as a cult.

According to the followers of Sergei Torop and some of his own explanations, on 18 August 1990, at the age of 29, Sergey had a “spiritual awakening”. He gave his first public teaching after awakening in Minusinsk on 18 August 1991. 

He founded the "Church of the Last Testament" (Церковь Последнего Завета Tserkov Poslednego Zaveta), also known as the "Community of Unified Faith", with its head church located in the Siberian Taiga in the Minusinsk Depression east of Abakan, in the small settlement called "Abode of Dawn" (official name) or "The Sun City" (unofficial name) near Petropavlovka. Since then, the Christianity-based religious movement has amassed more than 10,000 followers around the world with around 4,000 living in the few settlements in Siberia near Vissarion. 

As Vissarion, he teaches reincarnation, veganism, and harmonious human relations predicting the end of the world.

Since 1991, on the basis of Vissarion's meetings, teachings and speeches, a multi-volume text called “The Last Testament” has been written, outlining a set of principles focused on self-improvement, self-governance and community.

In September 2020 Vissarion and two of his close students were arrested and taken away from homes by helicopters during an operation by Russia’s Investigative Committee. The Russian authorities accused them of “creating a religious group whose activities may impose violence on citizens”. As of 2021 Vissarion and the two others are being kept in prison in Novosibirsk, despite the fact that there is no evidence that can confirm the accusations and no proper criminal indictment. No trial has been scheduled.

Biography 
Sergei Anatolyevitch Torop was born in Krasnodar to Anatoly Torop and Nadezhda (née Malashenko). At 18, he began compulsory service by enlisting in the Red Army, becoming a sergeant working on building sites in Mongolia, followed by three years as a factory metal worker in Minusinsk, Siberia. In the town, he worked as a patrol officer before losing his job in 1989. Reported to have gained nine commendations during his five years of service, he was made redundant.

Torop claims that in 1990 he was "reborn" as Vissarion (meaning "he who gives new life"), claiming to be a returned Jesus Christ. In his system this does not make him God, but instead the word of God. His religious beliefs combines elements of the Russian Orthodox Church with Buddhism, apocalypticism, collectivism, and ecological values. Torop founded the Church of the Last Testament in Krasnoyarsk, Siberia in 1991 just before the fall of the USSR. He predicted the imminent end of the world with only his followers being saved.

His followers observe strict regulations, including abstaining from meat, smoking, drinking alcohol, swearing and the use of money. The aim of the group is to unite all religions on Earth. He replaced Christmas with a feast day on his birthday (14 January) and claimed to possess an ability to heal cancer and AIDS with a touch from his hand. The calendar runs from the day in 1961 of Vissarion's birth; the biggest feast day (August 18) originates from his first sermon in 1991.

It has some four thousand inhabitants, following ecological principles. The central settlement, also called The Town and The Mountain, has a three-tiered structure: the Town itself (Abode of Dawn), the Heavenly Abode, and the Temple Peak. The churches and houses are built from wood by hand, most of the energy used originating from windmills or solar panels.

Media coverage 
Since 1992, biographer Vadim Redkin has published an annual volume detailing Vissarion's activities. Vissarion has attracted followers from Germany's esoteric subculture, and seven volumes of Vadim's account have been translated into German.

In May 2012, the Vice YouTube channel released "Cult Leader Thinks He's Jesus (Documentary Exclusive)", containing a report by Rocco Castoro, a reporter for Vice in Petropavlovka, and his interview with Vissarion. This was the first time Vissarion had granted an interview in three years.

In 2018, the Japanese show Hyper Hardboiled Gourmet Report visited the City of the Sun, but did not interview the founder (Vissarion). They were able to interview multiple adherents, including children and a sub-founder.

2020 arrest
On 22 September 2020, Russian authorities arrested Vissarion on charges of running an illegal religious organisation, possible physical harm to others, and extortion. He was apprehended by the FSB and Russian police, and taken to Novosibirsk central district court, along with two aides, Vadim Redkin and Vladimir Vedernikov.

Personal life 
Torop repudiated his first wife and married a nineteen-year-old who had lived with him since she was a girl of seven. He has six children from the two marriages.

Vissarion has a younger half-sister, Irina. Though he has a biological mother named Nadyezhda, Vissarion considers Mary, mother of Jesus, as his own mother.

See also 
 Christianity in Russia
 List of messiah claimants
 List of people who have claimed to be Jesus
 Messiah complex

References

External links 
  
 Russian-language Last Testament
 English-language website
 English-language Last Testament
 Vissarion Community International Portal
 Vissarion's Personal page (Russian)
 Orthodox church and Vissarion
 Film of BBC A Long Weekend with The Son of God (Filmmaker George Carey).
 Stanislav Krupar's photos of Vissarion community
 Globe and Mail: Jesus Lives
 The Washington Post: Novel Faiths Find Followers Among Russia's Disillusioned
 The Guardian on him
 Section in news about religion in Russia listed under "Sect in Siberia 
 Sydney Morning Herald article
 ABC Nightline video and article
 Vice Guide to Travel: Jesus of Siberia
 Russian-language profile and critique
 Cult Leader Thinks He’s Jesus	
 Reincarnated Jesus' Secluded Siberian Sect
 NY Times Long Arm of Russian Law Reaches Obscure Siberian Church

1961 births
Living people
People from Krasnodar
Russian religious leaders
Russian Christian mystics
Self-declared messiahs
Sects
People adherents to christian new religious movements
Founders of new religious movements
20th-century apocalypticists
21st-century apocalypticists
Christian vegetarianism
Reincarnation
Cult leaders